John McCoy (born 1 July 1940) is a former Irish Progressive Democrats politician. He was elected to Dáil Éireann for the Limerick West constituency at the 1987 general election, along with 13 other Progressive Democrats Teachtaí Dála (TDs) to the 25th Dáil. He did not stand at the 1989 general election.

References

1940 births
Living people
Progressive Democrats TDs
Members of the 25th Dáil